Yarehanchinal is a village in the Yelburga taluk of Koppal district in Karnataka state, India. Yarehanchinal is 20 km from Kuknoor and 25 km from Gadag. Yarehanchinal can be reached by Gadag-Kuknoor route via Harlapur-Binnal.

Demographics
As of 2001 India census, Yarehanchinal had a population of 3,206 with 1,542 males and 1,484 females and 558 Households.

See also
Lakkundi
Itagi
Kuknoor
Dambal
Koppal
Kanaginahal

References

Villages in Koppal district